Gildersleeve on Broadway is a 1943 American film starring Harold Peary as his radio character The Great Gildersleeve. It is the third of four Gildersleeve features, others were The Great Gildersleeve (1942), Gildersleeve's Bad Day (1943), Gildersleeve's Ghost (1944).

Plot summary

Cast
 Harold Peary as Throckmorton P. Gildersleeve
 Billie Burke as Mrs. Laura Chandler
 Claire Carleton as Francine Gray
 Richard LeGrand as Mr. Peavey
 Freddie Mercer as Leroy Forrester
 Hobart Cavanaugh as Homer
 Margaret Landry as Marjorie Forrester
 Leonid Kinskey as Window Washer
 Ann Doran as Matilda Brown
 Lillian Randolph as Birdie
 Mike Road as Jimmy Clark 
 unbilled players include Lawrence Tierney, Barbara Hale, Dorothy Malone, and Teddy Infuhr.  as well as Jack Norton and Walter Tetley.

References

External links
 
 
 
 

1943 films
American comedy films
American black-and-white films
Films based on radio series
Films directed by Gordon Douglas
1943 comedy films
RKO Pictures films
1940s American films
The Great Gildersleeve
1940s English-language films